Melanophryniscus admirabilis is a species of toads in the family Bufonidae. It is endemic to Brazil.

References

admirabilis
Endemic fauna of Brazil
Amphibians described in 2006